National Highway 128C, commonly referred to as NH 128C is a national highway in India. It is a secondary route of National Highway 28.  NH-128C runs in the state of Uttar Pradesh in India.

Route 
NH128C connects Azamgarh and Dohrighat in the state of Uttar Pradesh.

Junctions  

  Terminal near Azamgarh.
  Terminal near Dohrighat.

See also 
 List of National Highways in India
 List of National Highways in India by state

References

External links 

 NH 128C on OpenStreetMap

National highways in India
National Highways in Uttar Pradesh